Zincirli stele usually refers to one of a number of steles found in the archaeological site of Zincirli:
 Kilamuwa Stela
 Kilamuwa scepter
 Victory stele of Esarhaddon
 Hadad Statue

 Panamuwa II inscription

 Bar-Rakib inscriptions

 Stele of Ördek-Burnu
 Kuttamuwa stele, a stele found in 2008 dedicated to "Kuttamuwa servant of Panamuwa"
 Pancarli Hoyuk inscription